Michael H. Rohl is an American politician serving as a member of the South Dakota Senate from the 1st district. Elected in November 2020, he assumed office on January 12, 2021.

Education 
Rohl earned a Bachelor of Science degree in accounting from Drake University.

Career 
Outside of politics, Rohl has worked as a hotel manager. He was elected to the South Dakota Senate in November 2020 and assumed office on January 12, 2021. He is also a member of the Senate Judiciary Committee and Senate State Affairs Committee.

During his tenure in the Senate, Rohl has advocated for marijuana legalization in South Dakota. He is the prime sponsor of Senate Bill 3, which would legalize recreational marijuana and decriminalize its use.

References 

Living people
Republican Party South Dakota state senators
Drake University alumni
Year of birth missing (living people)